Karim Rassi is a Lebanese Greek Orthodox politician. He was born in Tripoli in 1967. He studied political science at the American University of Beirut. He is a member of the political bureau of the Marada Movement.

He was elected to parliament in 1994, filling the seat that was vacated when his father Abdullah Al Rassi. He was again elected to parliament in the 2000 elections.

Rassi is the son-in-law of the Lebanese academic Elie Salem.

References

1967 births
Living people
Members of the Parliament of Lebanon
Greek Orthodox Christians from Lebanon

Marada Movement politicians